There are a number of sites on the Queensland Heritage Register in Warwick. These include:

References

Warwick, Queensland
Warwick
Warwick